Kalateh-ye Mazar or Kalateh Mazar may refer to:
 Kalateh-ye Mazar, Nehbandan, South Khorasan Province
 Kalateh-ye Mazar, Zirkuh, South Khorasan Province
 Kalateh-ye Mazar, Razavi Khorasan